Ilia Kushev (sometimes also transliterated as Iliya Kushev) (born 13 December 1980) is a former professional tennis player from Bulgaria. He has frequently played for Bulgaria at the Davis Cup. On 16 August 2004, he reached his highest ATP singles ranking of 285 whilst his best doubles ranking was 234 on 16 August 2004.

In 2006, Kushev married Vesela Tomova, a tennis coach.

Year-end rankings

Challenger and Futures Finals

Singles: 9 (1–8)

Doubles: 13 (5–8)

Davis Cup 
Ilia Kushev debuted for the Bulgaria Davis Cup team in 2003. Since then he has 13 nominations with 11 ties played, his singles W/L record is 3–5 and doubles W/L record is 4–4 (7–9 overall).

Singles (3–5)

Doubles (4–4) 

 RPO = Relegation Play–off

Honours 
Best Bulgarian tennis player – 2005

References

External links

 
 
 

Bulgarian male tennis players
Sportspeople from Plovdiv
1980 births
Living people
21st-century Bulgarian people